The Louisville Lightning were an American professional indoor soccer team based at the Mockingbird Valley Soccer Club in Louisville, Kentucky. They joined the Professional Arena Soccer League in 2009 and suspended operations in 2012 after three full seasons.

2009-10 season

The 2009–10 Louisville Lightning season was the first season of the Louisville Lightning professional indoor soccer club. The Lightning, an Eastern Division team in the Professional Arena Soccer League, played their home games at the Mockingbird Valley Soccer Club in Louisville, Kentucky.

During their inaugural season, the Lightning went 11-5, finishing second in the Eastern Division to the Cincinnati Kings. The team also reached the finals of the 2009–10 United States Open Cup for Arena Soccer, losing to the San Diego Sockers.

Regular season

US Open Cup

2010-11 season

The 2010–11 Louisville Lightning season was the second season of the Louisville Lightning professional indoor soccer club. The Lightning, an Eastern Division team in the Professional Arena Soccer League, played their home games at the Mockingbird Valley Soccer Club in Louisville, Kentucky.

The 2010-11 season began with high expectations in Louisville, as the team became the first PASL team to sign three former Major League Soccer players to the team at the same time. Joining John Michael Hayden, who was returning from the previous year, were Othaniel Yanez and Thabiso Khumalo. Unfortunately, the team went 8-8, which was good enough for second in the Eastern Division over the Detroit Waza by goal differential, but a step back from the previous year.

Regular season

US Open Cup

- The Lightning and Cincinnati Kings were slated to play each other in the semifinals of the US Open Cup, but due to miscommunication and scheduling conflicts, the PASL forced Louisville to forfeit instead of counting the March 4 game towards both the PASL regular season and the US Open Cup, as is normally done to combat costs from travel when applicable. Had this game counted for both levels, Louisville would have played the San Diego Sockers in the finals of the US Open Cup for the second consecutive year. Instead, San Diego defeated Cincinnati 13-6.

2011-12 schedule

The 2011–12 Louisville Lightning season was the third season of the Louisville Lightning professional indoor soccer club. The Lightning, an Eastern Division team in the Professional Arena Soccer League, played their home games in the Mockingbird Valley Soccer Club in Louisville, Kentucky. 

On October 28, 2011, the Lightning played a pre-season split-squad exhibition match dubbed the "Kick Cancer Game". The team won 11 games and lost 5 during the 2011–12 regular season. They played all 16 of these games against Eastern Division rivals Cincinnati Kings, Detroit Waza, Illinois Piasa, Kansas Magic, and Ohio Vortex. The team qualified for the postseason but lost to the Kansas Magic in the first round of the playoffs.

The Louisville Lightning also participated in the 2011–12 United States Open Cup for Arena Soccer. The team defeated Indy Elite FC in the wild card round but lost to the Cincinnati Kings in the Round of 16, ending their run in the tournament.

References

Louisville Lightning
Soccer in Kentucky
Louisville, Kentucky-related lists